Ralph C. Colley Jr. (May 13, 1944 – January 30, 2021), known as Chad Colley, was an American para-alpine skier, army officer and advocate for disabled Americans. He represented the United States at the 1992 Winter Paralympics held in Tignes and Albertville, France.

Biography 
Colley born in Fort Smith, Arkansas, on May 12, 1944. He was commissioned into the US Army in 1966 and served in the 101st Airborne Division during the Vietnam war. Whilst commanding an infantry company he lost both legs and his left arm in July 1968 when a landmine exploded. He was awarded the Bronze Star Medal, Silver Star and Purple Heart and left the army with the rank of captain. On his return home he entered into a career in real estate and was active in disabled veterans' affairs. President George H. W. Bush appointed him Vice Chairman of the President’s Committee on Employment of People with Disabilities and he served as National Commander of the Disabled American Veterans association. He died on January 30, 2021, at the age of 76.

Paralympic medals 
At the 1992 Winter Paralympics held in Tignes and Albertville, France, he won the gold medal in the Men's Downhill LW10 event and in the Men's Super-G LW10 event.

Military awards 
  Silver Star
  Bronze Star
  Purple Heart

See also 
 List of Paralympic medalists in alpine skiing

References 

1944 births
2021 deaths
People from Fort Smith, Arkansas
Military personnel from Arkansas
Paralympic alpine skiers of the United States
American male alpine skiers
Alpine skiers at the 1992 Winter Paralympics
Medalists at the 1992 Winter Paralympics
Paralympic gold medalists for the United States
Paralympic medalists in alpine skiing
Recipients of the Silver Star
United States Army personnel of the Vietnam War
United States Army officers
Landmine victims
American amputees
20th-century American people
21st-century American people